R. aquatica may refer to:

 Roseomonas aquatica, a species of bacteria
 Rotula aquatica, a species of flowering plant